Ralf Örjan Valter Ramberg, né Rahmberg (26 February 1948), is a Swedish actor, born in Örgryte, Gothenburg.

Biography 
Örjan Ramberg started his acting career in musicals with leading parts in the original Swedish stagings of Hair (1971) and Jesus Christ Superstar (1972; opposite, among others, Agnetha Fältskog (later of ABBA) as Mary Magdalene). He was later educated in the dramatic arts at Sweden's National Academy of Dramatic Art (in Sweden colloquially known as "Scenskolan") in Malmö, 1974–1977. Since 1978, he has been part of Sweden's Royal Dramatic Theatre (Dramaten) ensemble.

In 1969, he recorded a single, "Balladen om killen", produced by Göran Lagerberg, which became a minor hit on Tio i Topp, reaching number 13.

Acting work 
On stage, Örjan Ramberg has had both leading and supporting parts: in Nathanael West's En kall miljon (A Cool Million), Ben Jonson's Alkemisten, Marivaux's Paradisbarn, Bulgakov's Mästaren och Margarita, Lars Norén's Natten är dagens mor, Margaretha Garpe's Till Julia, Lessing's Emilio Gallotti, in the stage adaptation of Astrid Lindgren's Emil i Lönneberga (children's theatre production), Shepard's En riktig västern, Shakespeare's Romeo and Juliet, Sommar (Summer) written and directed by Lars Norén, Beaumarchais' Figaros Bröllop (The Marriage of Figaro), Federico García Lorca's Blodsbröllop (Blood Wedding), Shakespeare's Lika för lika (Measure for Measure), Euripides' Medea (directed by Lennart Hjulström), Shakespeare's Så tuktas en argbigga (The Taming of the Shrew) children's play Mio, min Mio (based on the novel by Astrid Lindgren) and in Alfred de Musset's Lek ej med kärleken (On ne badine pas avec l'amour ), among others.

In the 2000s, he has collaborated on stage with directors Ingmar Bergman and John Caird in particular. He portrayed Johansson in Strindberg's classic The Ghost Sonata, directed by Bergman in 2000, Oberon in A Midsummer Night's Dream, directed by Caird in 2000, The Emcee in the musical Cabaret (2001), Malvolio in Twelfth Night (Caird), Ibsen's Gengångare (Ghosts), (directed by Bergman; 2002) and the leading role in Molière's  (The Imaginary Invalid) in 2003.

He appeared as Charles Condomine in Noël Coward's Min fru går igen (Blithe Spirit) (2005), in the co-Nordic production of the Sami staging of Ibsen's Kungsämnena (The Pretenders) and in Shakespeare's Macbeth (directed by Staffan Valdemar Holm) spring/autumn 2006.

On film and TV, he has appeared sporadically for example as the investigating photographer Harry Friberg in the Stieg Trenter-crime films for television in 1987, as Chief Editor Schyman in Colin Nutley's thriller  (aka Deadline/The Bomber), based on the book by Liza Marklund, and his recent supporting part as the bar pianist in TV-series  (The Furniture Salesman's Daughter) (2006).

In 1994 Ramberg was awarded the Golden Mask (which is the Swedish equivalent to the Tony Award/s) for Best Actor for his portrayal of Murphy in the stage production of One Flew Over the Cuckoo's Nest (at Folkan 1993/94) and in 2001 he received the prestigious Eugene O'Neill Award.

On 3 February 2007, John Caird's production of Strindberg's The Dance of Death premiered at the Royal Dramatic Theatre with Ramberg in the lead as The Captain (with both original parts of the play performed together; Dödsdansen I-II).

In the spring of 2008, he appeared as King Claudius in Staffan Valdemar Holm's production of Hamlet by Shakespeare (original cast), and in the spring of 2009 in Chekhov's Uncle Vanya.

His work there was discontinued by Dramaten in the end of March 2019 following demonstrations triggered by a Sveriges Television documentary Josefin Nilsson - Love me for who I am which, without mentioning him by name,<ref>https://www.svt.se/kultur/producenten-josefins-historia-har-varit-fokus</ June 28, 2019 (Swedish)</ref> revealed his physical and mental aggression, including death threats, against deceased ex-partner Josefin Nilsson.

Personal life 
Besides Nilsson, in the mid-1970s and 1980s Ramberg was the love partner of Swedish actress and Royal Dramatic Theatre colleague Lena Olin with whom he has a son. In the 1980s-1990s he also lived with actress Ewa Fröling with whom he has daughter Tilde Fröling.

Selected filmography 
 2008 – Häxdansen (SVT, mini series)
 2006 – Den enskilde medborgaren
 2006 – Möbelhandlarens dotter (TV-series)
 2003 – Paradiset
 2001 – Sprängaren
 1996 – Gökboet (One Flew Over the Cuckoo's Nest) (TV-theatre)
 1996 – Nu är pappa trött igen
 1994 – Stockholm Marathon
 1993 – Sökarna
 1986 – Älska mej
 1985 – Falsk som vatten
 1985 – Svindlande affärer
 1979 – Repmånad eller Hur man gör pojkar av män
 1987 – Träff i helfigur
 1987 – I dag röd
 1987 – Lysande landning
 1977 – Jack

Stage work at Dramaten 
Örjan Ramberg's stage credits at the Royal Dramatic Theatre can be found here (info from "Rollboken" – Dramaten.se).

References

External links 

Publicity photo at Dramaten.se

1948 births
Living people
Swedish male actors
Eugene O'Neill Award winners
Litteris et Artibus recipients